Sheree Folkson is a British film and television director.

Some of her television credits are American Horror Story, The Bill, Band of Gold, Doctor Who, The Young Person's Guide to Becoming a Rock Star, Casanova, Hope Springs, Truckers, the American series Ugly Betty, Penny Dreadful: City of Angels, Bridgerton and Sex/Life.

Her film credits include Gypsy Woman (2001), My Family and Other Animals (2005) and The Decoy Bride (2011) starring David Tennant.

References

External links

British film directors
British television directors
British women film directors
British women television directors
Living people
Place of birth missing (living people)
Year of birth missing (living people)